Walter Sarnoi Oupathana (born June 23, 1986) is a Lao-American professional boxer. He represented Laos at the 2021 Asian Boxing Championships held in Dubai, United Arab Emirates, and at the 2021 AIBA World Boxing Championships held in Belgrade, Serbia.

Background 
Sarnoi was born to a Lao-descent family, his father was a professional boxer from Thailand who fought against Fighting Harada. Sarnoi began his boxing career in 1999. In 2003, he won the silver medal at the US U19 National Championships and the silver medal at the 2005 US National Golden Gloves Tournament.

Sarnoi attended Northern Michigan University on a scholarship funded by the US Olympic Committee where he boxed for the university.

In 2018, Sarnoi earned the WBC interim Latino silver featherweight title. The bout took place in Jamay, Jalisco, Mexico.

In May 2021, Sarnoi competed at the 2021 Asian Amateur Boxing Championships representing Laos, the bout took place in the United Arab Emirates.

In October 2021, Sarnoi competed at the 2021 AIBA World Boxing Championships in Belgrade, Serbia in the 60kg lightweight division representing The People’s Democratic Republic of Laos as the only representative competing for the country.

In May 2022, Sarnoi represented Laos at the 2021 Southeast Asian Games that took place from 16 to 22 May 2022 in Bắc Ninh, Vietnam at Bắc Ninh Gymnasium at the Men's Lightweight (63 kg) division.

References

External links 
 

1986 births
Living people
American male boxers
Lightweight boxers
AIBA World Boxing Championships medalists
World Boxing Council champions